William Luckyn may refer to:

Sir William Luckyn, 1st Baronet (c. 1633-c. 1678) of the Luckyn Baronets
Sir William Luckyn, 2nd Baronet (c. 1700) of the Luckyn Baronets